The Mayor of Gibraltar is the ceremonial official of the British overseas territory of Gibraltar. The mayor is appointed by the elected Members of Parliament and the office is situated at City Hall John Mackintosh Square. Since 1 June 2021, Christian Santos GMD has held the position of Mayor of Gibraltar, succeeding John Goncalves MBE GMD.

History

Since its creation in 1921, the city council had a chairman. In 1955, upon request of the members of the city council, the post was renamed to mayor, and therefore, the mayor of Gibraltar was chosen from among the members of the council. Joshua Hassan, MVO, QC, JP, the chairman of the city council at the time become the first mayor of Gibraltar.

1969 Constitution

The city council disappeared when the new Gibraltar Constitution Order in Council was signed in 1969. However, the mayor of Gibraltar survived, but only with a ceremonial character, and was to be elected by the House of Assembly (later the Parliament). This meant that office was invariably taken by the Speaker or a government minister.

The 1969 Constitution stated:

2006 Constitution

Following the new 2006 Constitution, the mayor no longer had to be chosen from among the members of Parliament. Instead, the mayor is appointed by Parliament. The intention was to move to a new system whereby citizens from the community at large can be appointed mayor for a one-year period, although this can sometimes be for longer. The Government of Gibraltar announced that a deputy mayor would also be appointed for the same period and would then take up the office of mayor.

Appointment

The Mayor of Gibraltar is appointed by Parliament but no longer from within Parliament, and is to hold the position for a minimum one-year period. As per the 2006 Constitution:

Deputy

A deputy mayor is at the same time appointed by Parliament for one year to assist and support the mayor in the discharge of mayoral duties, as well as to act as mayor when she or he is unable to participate in a civic event. The deputy will take office as mayor the following year and a new deputy appointed, and so on.

Duties

Since 1969, the duties of the mayor are entirely ceremonial and civic. The posts of mayor and deputy mayor of Gibraltar are honorific and thus unpaid.

List of mayors

The following is a list of all the mayors of Gibraltar since the first tenure began in 1955:

References

 
Gibraltar-related lists